Lešnica is a village in the municipality of Gostivar, North Macedonia.

Demographics
As of the 2021 census, Lešnica had 128 residents with the following ethnic composition:
Macedonians 99
Albanians 31
Persons for whom data are taken from administrative sources 9

References

External links

Villages in Gostivar Municipality
Albanian communities in North Macedonia